Mariano de Osorio (1777–1819) was a Spanish general and Governor of Chile, from 1814 to 1815.

Early career
Osorio was born in Seville, Spain. He joined the Spanish army and as many of his contemporaries, his military career began during the Spanish Peninsular War in 1808 as an artillery general, as well as the professor for mathematics in the military school. In 1810, was appointed head of the military factory of Catalonia. In 1812, was destined to the Royal Army in Peru.

In 1812 he resettled in Peru, where he married Joaquina de la Pezuela, daughter of Peruvian Viceroy Joaquín de la Pezuela. In the Disaster of Rancagua (1814) he was able to defeat the forces of Bernardo O'Higgins and Jose Miguel Carrera. In the same year he became the Governor of Chile.

Chile
With Osorio's victory at Rancagua, the period known as "reconquest" (Reconquista) of Chile had begun. Osorio sought to reinstate order and justice and with military measures he prevented the onslaught of the insurgents.

In 1816 he returned to Lima and Francisco Marcó del Pont was made new Governor of Chile. When the Spaniards lost the Battle of Chacabuco, he returned to Chile. There he succeeded in securing victory in the Second Battle of Cancha Rayada on March 18, 1818. At this battle O'Higgins's arm was injured.

The Battle of Maipu, however, was a major defeat for the Spaniards, and it signified the end of the Spanish authority in almost all of Chile, with the exception of the island of Chiloé and the city of Valdivia.

Osorio proceeded to Cuba, where he died in 1819 of malaria.

1777 births
1819 deaths
People from Seville
Spanish generals
Royal Governors of Chile
Spanish military personnel of the Chilean War of Independence
Royalists in the Hispanic American Revolution
Spanish military personnel of the Napoleonic Wars